

A

 Hans von Aachen
 Alfonso Aldiverti
 Matteo Perez d'Aleccio
 Alessandro Allori
 Cristofano Allori
 Giovanni Anastasi
 Ippolito Andreasi
 Sofonisba Anguissola
 Vincenzio Ansaloni
 Michelangelo Anselmi
 Cesare Arbasia
 Livio Agresti

B

 Antonio Badile
 Giovanni Balducci
 Camillo Ballini
 Federico Barocci
 Domenico di Pace Beccafumi
 Giovanni Biliverti
 Giovanni Bizzelli
 Ippolito Borghese
 Hieronymus Bosch
 Giovanni Battista Brazzè
 Francesco Brenti
 Hendrick van den Broeck
 Bronzino
 Giulio Bruni
 Giuliano Bugiardini
 Ludovico Buti
 Giovanni Maria Butteri

C

 Denis Calvaert
 Antoine Caron
 Bernardo Castello
 Mirabello Cavalori
 Francesco Cavazzone
 Benvenuto Cellini
 Bernardino Cesari
 Giuseppe Cesari
 Jacopo da Empoli
 Cigoli
 Hendrik de Clerck
 Grazio Cossali
 Baldassare Croce
 Francesco Curradi

D

 Felice Damiani
 Daniele da Volterra
 Niccolò dell'Abbate
 Giovanni Durante

E

 El Greco

F

 Giovanni Antonio Fasolo
 Odoardo Fialetti
 Sebastiano Filippi
 Marcello Fogolino
 Pier Francesco Foschi

G

 Lattanzio Gambara
 Benvenuto Tisi
 Cristofano Gherardi
 Giambologna
 Girolamo da Carpi
 Hendrik Goltzius
 Fermo Guisoni

I

 Girolamo Imparato
 Bernardino India

K

 Julije Klović

L

 Giovanni Antonio Lappoli
 Tommaso Laureti
 Andrea Lilio
 Luca Longhi
 Aurelio Luini

M

 Girolamo Macchietti
 Alessandro Maganza
 Lattanzio Mainardi
 Rutilio di Lorenzo Manetti
 Marco Marchetti
 Pietro Marescalchi
 Donato Mascagni
 Lucio Massari
 Giuseppe Mazzuoli (c. 1536–1589)
 Francesco Menzocchi
 Andrea di Mariotto del Minga
 Francesco Morandini
 Giovanni Battista Moroni
 Raffaellino da Reggio

N

 Giovanni Battista Naldini
 Cesare Nebbia
 Nosadella
 Carlo Francesco Nuvolone
 Panfilo Nuvolone

O

 Lelio Orsi

P

 Benedetto Pagni
 Parmigianino
 Bartolomeo Passarotti
 Domenico Passignano
 Simone Peterzano
 Bernardino Poccetti
 Jacopo Pontormo
 Giuseppe Porta
 Camillo Procaccini
 Carlo Antonio Procaccini

R

 Giacomo Rocca
 Giulio Romano
 Cristoforo Roncalli
 Matteo Rosselli
 Francesco de' Rossi (Il Salviati)
 Rosso Fiorentino

S

 Maso da San Friano
 Scarsellino
 Sebastiano del Piombo
 Il Sodoma
 Jan Soens
 Giacomo Stella
 Stradanus
 Francesco Stringa
 Studiolo of Francois I

T

 Lazzaro Tavarone
 Tintoretto
 Santi di Tito
 Michele Tosini

V

 Francesco Vanni
 Tanzio da Varallo
 Giorgio Vasari
 Otto van Veen
 Marcello Venusti
 Paolo Veronese

W

 Joachim Wtewael

Z

 Giacomo Zanguidi
 Filippo Zaniberti
 Federico Zuccari
 Taddeo Zuccari
 Jacopo Zucchi

See also
 
 
 Mannerism artists and their masterpieces (written in Japanese)

 
Mannerist

Mannerist
16th-century painters
17th-century painters
Mannerism